Kanino-Timansky District was a former district (raion) of the Nenets National Okrug in the RSFSR of the former Soviet Union. The district existed from 1929 to 1959.

Location 

Kanino-Timansky district was located in the far west of the Nenets Autonomous Okrug, on the Kanin Peninsula and some of the mainland, and close to the Timan Ridge, which is probably where the district got its name from. Its territory was mostly formed in a curve around Chosha Bay.

History 

The district was formed on 15 July 1929, from a part of the Mezensky District of the Arkhangelsk Governorate. The administrative center of the district was the settlement of Nizhnyaya Pyosha. As of 1 January 1939, the district had an area of 53,100km2 and it had a population of 2,700. It included 16 settlements in 4 selsoviets.

In 1939, the number of selsoviets had increased to 6:
 Indigsky 
 Malozemelsky 
 Nessky
 Omsky
 Pyoshsky
 Shoynsky

By 1940, this number had increased again to 7 and the district itself increased in size to 63,500km2.

In 1959, all of the districts in the Nenets Autonomous Okrug, including Kanino-Timansky district, were abolished and became directly subordinated to Naryan-Mar. Today, the former territory of Kanino-Timansky district is a part of the Zapolyarny District, the only one in the Nenets AO.

Media 

One newspaper company, called "The Socialist Arctic", existed in the district from 1932 until the district was abolished.

References 

Populated places established in 1929
Subdivisions of the Russian Soviet Federative Socialist Republic
Nenets Autonomous Okrug
1929 establishments in the Soviet Union
1959 disestablishments in the Soviet Union
Populated places disestablished in 1959